Family tree of the Trpimirović Dynasty a Croatian royal family, from 845 to 1091.

Family tree

References

External links 
 STABLO Trpimirović Royal Family - rulers of Croatia
 Trpimirović Dynasty from Tomislav to Dmitar Zvonimir

family tree
Family trees
Trpimirović
10th-century Croatian nobility
11th-century Croatian nobility